The Russian Amateur Radio Union (in Russian, Союз радиолюбителей России, Romanized as Soyuz Radiolyubitelei Rossii) is a national non-profit organization for amateur radio enthusiasts in Russia.  The organization often uses SRR as its official abbreviation, based on the standard Romanization of the Russian name.  The organization was founded in 1992.

SRR promotes amateur radio by sponsoring amateur radio operating awards and radio contests.  SRR will be the host organization for the 2010 World Radiosport Team Championship, to be held in Moscow.  The SRR also represents the interests of Russian amateur radio operators and shortwave listeners before Russian and international telecommunications regulatory authorities.  SRR is the national member society representing Russia in the International Amateur Radio Union.

See also 
International Amateur Radio Union

References

External links 
World Radiosport Team Championship 2010

Russia
Clubs and societies in Russia
1992 establishments in Russia
Organizations established in 1992
Radio in Russia
Organizations based in Moscow